Armavir gyux (also, Արմավիր գյուղ, Aralykh, Verin Armavir) is a town in the Armavir Province of Armenia.

Population

See also 
Armavir Province

References 

Populated places in Armavir Province